The Great Fire of Northampton occurred in September 1675 in Northampton in Northamptonshire, England. The blaze was caused by sparks from an open fire on St. Mary’s Street, near Northampton Castle. The fire devastated the town centre, destroying about 700 of the town's 850 buildings, including All Saints church, in six hours. Three quarters of the town was destroyed, 11 people died and about 700 families were made homeless. Many people escaped the fire by going through Welsh House on the market square to safety.

Local people and businesses raised £25,000 towards re-building the town centre based around the Market Square. Streets were widened to help prevent a re-occurrence. King Charles II donated 1,000 tons of timber from Salcey Forest for the re-building. A commemorative statue of the king (dressed in a Roman toga) stands on the portico of the re-built All Saints church.

In 1724, the town's new appearance inspired author and traveler Daniel Defoe to describe Northampton as the "handsomest and best built town in all this part of England… finely rebuilt with brick and stone, and the streets made spacious and wide".

The fire received fictional treatment in book 2 of Alan Moore's 2016 novel Jerusalem.

See also
 Hazelrigg House - a historic Grade II listed house that escaped the fire.

References

External links
Northampton Chronicle article
Contemporary account of the fire of Northampton 1675
Great fire web-page

History of Northampton
17th-century fires
1675 disasters
1675 in England
1675
Fires in England
Urban fires in the United Kingdom
17th century in Northamptonshire